Kevin Anthony Barry (15 May 1950 – 21 May 2012) was a New Zealand rugby league footballer who represented New Zealand in the 1975 World Cup.

Playing career
Barry played for the Mt Roskill Red Devils in the Auckland Rugby League competition before being named for Auckland in 1973.

He was named in the New Zealand national rugby league team squad at the 1975 World Cup but did not play in a match at the tournament. Before he represented the Kiwis, Barry was the vice captain of the New Zealand Universities side, which played the Australian Universities in three Tests at home in 1971.

Barry died on 21 May 2012 in Beenleigh, Queensland, Australia.

References

1950 births
2012 deaths
Auckland rugby league team players
Bay Roskill Vikings players
New Zealand national rugby league team players
New Zealand rugby league players
Rugby league halfbacks
Rugby league players from the Auckland Region